McAdam or MacAdam may refer to:

People
McAdam (surname)

Places

Canada
 McAdam, New Brunswick
 McAdam station, a National Historic Site in the village.
 McAdam Parish, New Brunswick
 McAdams Lake, Nova Scotia

United States
 McAdam, Virginia
 McAdam, Washington

Other
Macadam, a method of road building.
MacAdam ellipse, the region of chromaticity representing just noticeable differences to the human eye.
MacAdam Shield Shovel, a shovel used by the Canadian army during First World War.